Grevillea acropogon is a species of flowering plant in the family Proteaceae and is endemic to a restricted part of southwestern Western Australia. It is a prostrate to erect shrub with pinnatisect leaves with five to seven sharply-pointed lobes, and red flowers.

Description
Flowering occurs from June to September.

Taxonomy
Grevillea acropogon was first formally described in 2000 by Robert Owen Makinson in the Flora of Australia based on material collected near Lake Unicup, west of Frankland, in 1996. The specific epithet (acrobotrya) means "bearded at the end".

Distribution and habitat
This grevillea is only known from the type location, where it grows in heathland in winter-wet situations.

Conservation status
Grevillea acropogon is listed as "endangered" under the Australian Government Environment Protection and Biodiversity Conservation Act 1999 and as "Threatened Flora (Declared Rare Flora — Extant)" by the Department of Biodiversity, Conservation and Attractions. Only five individuals were known in 2015 but after a fenced enclosure was constructed the population increased to 275 in 2014. In 2009, 150 seedlings were introduced to a new site. The main threats to the species include damage by vehicles, drought, trampling by kangaroos and changes in hydrology.

References

acropogon
Eudicots of Western Australia
Proteales of Australia
Taxa named by Robert Owen Makinson
Plants described in 2000